Rafael Barraza Sánchez (24 October 1928 – 26 July 2020) was a Mexican Roman Catholic bishop.

Barraza Sánchez was born in Mexico and was ordained to the priesthood in 1951. He served as titular bishop of Drivastum and as auxiliary bishop of the Roman Catholic Archdiocese of Durango, Mexico, from 1979 to 1981 and then as bishop of the Roman Catholic Diocese of Mazatlán, Mexico, from 1981 to 2005.

Notes

1928 births
2020 deaths
20th-century Roman Catholic bishops in Mexico
21st-century Roman Catholic bishops in Mexico